Gerald Lester Byrd (March 9, 1920 – April 11, 2005) was an American musician who played the lap steel guitar in country and Hawaiian music, as well as a singer-songwriter and the head of a music publishing firm. He appeared on numerous radio programs.

Career
Byrd was born in Lima, Ohio, United States, one of five siblings, his interest in the instrument began after a "tent show" when he was 12 and by 15 he was playing in bars. Although his initial interest was Hawaiian music much of his work was country. In 1944/1945 he joined the Grand Ole Opry. He was important to the early career of Dolly Parton being one of the first to sign her. He also was an educator of the steel guitar giving lessons to Jimmie Vaughan and Jerry Garcia among others. The list of artists that Byrd played or recorded with included Hank Williams, Ernest Tubb, Patsy Cline and Red Foley and countless others. With Hank Williams he played songs such as "I'm So Lonesome I Could Cry", "Lovesick Blues" and "A Mansion on the Hill." In the early 1970s, he moved to Hawaii and worked on reviving Hawaiian steel guitar music, taking a great delight in giving lap steel lessons to the young musicians who showed interest in ensuring that the lap steel remained an important instrument in Hawaiian music. While living in Hawaii, Byrd had a regular weekly gig with his trio at the Royal Hawaiian Hotel that lasted until his death. Though Byrd often joked about pedal steel guitar players, he had nothing but the highest of praise for Buddy Emmons, saying he had taken the steel guitar to new places with his playing.

Personal life and death
He published his autobiography It Was a Trip: On The Wings of Music. Byrd died of Parkinson's disease at 85 in Honolulu, Hawaii, where he had resided for 30 years; he was survived by wife Kaleo Wood and two daughters.

Awards and recognition
He was inducted into the Steel Guitar Hall of Fame in 1978 as its first member; his Rickenbacker lap steel is housed at the Country Music Hall of Fame

Discography

Studio albums
 Nani Hawaii (1953) Mercury
Byrd's Exhibition (1954) Mercury
Guitar Magic (1954) Mercury
Steel Guitar Favorites (1958) Mercury
Hi-Fi Guitar (1958) Decca
On the Shores of Waikiki (1960) Decca
Byrd of Paradise (1961) Monument
Memories of Maria (1962) Monument
Blue Hawaiian Steel Guitar (1963) Mercury
Man of Steel (1964) Mercury
Satin Strings of Steel (1965) Monument
Potpourri (1966) Monument
Burning Sands, Pearly Shells, & Steel Guitars (1967) MonumentCountry Steel Guitar Greats (1966) WingSteel Guitar Hawaiian Style (1976) LehuaPolynesian Suite (1995) Sony Music DistributionChristmas in Hawaii (2003) Lehua

CompilationsJerry Byrd: By Request (2002) Mountain AppleSteel Guitar (2002) Mountain AppleThe Master of Touch and Tone (2005) Mountain AppleMaster of the Steel Guitar, Vol. 1 (2005) Hana Ola—Rsi

As sideman

Other players on Hank's recordings include Dale "Smokey" Lohman (Early recordings), also Don Davis played one or two sessions with Hank. From 1950 on it was Don Helms."

With Jack McDuffGin and Orange (Cadet, 1969)
With Don PattersonSatisfaction!'' (Prestige, 1965)

Further reading

References

External links
 [ AllMusic]

1920 births
2005 deaths
Steel guitarists
Neurological disease deaths in Hawaii
Deaths from Parkinson's disease
People from Lima, Ohio
American country singer-songwriters
Monument Records artists
Decca Records artists
Mercury Records artists
20th-century American guitarists
Singer-songwriters from Ohio
Guitarists from Hawaii
Guitarists from Ohio
American male guitarists
Country musicians from Ohio
Country musicians from Hawaii
20th-century American singers
20th-century American male musicians
American male singer-songwriters
Singer-songwriters from Hawaii